Lobophytum is a genus of soft  corals commonly known as devil's hand corals or devil's hand leather corals.

Habitat and range
Lobophytum species can be found in shallow water throughout a wide area of the tropical Indo-Pacific.

Species
Lobophytum altum Tixier-Durivault, 1956
Lobophytum anomolum Li, 1984
Lobophytum batarum Moser, 1919
Lobophytum borbonicum von Marenzeller, 1886
Lobophytum caputospiculatum Li, 1984
Lobophytum catalai Tixier-Durivault, 1957
Lobophytum compactum Tixier-Durivault, 1956
Lobophytum crassodigitum Li, 1984
Lobophytum crassospiculatum (Moser, 1919)
Lobophytum crassum von Marenzeller, 1886
Lobophytum crebliplicatum von Marenzeller, 1886
Lobophytum cristagalli von Marenzeller, 1886
Lobophytum cristatum Tixier-Durivault, 1970
Lobophytum cryptocormum Verseveldt & Tursch, 1979
Lobophytum delectum Tixier-Durivault, 1966
Lobophytum densum Tixier-Durivault, 1970
Lobophytum denticulatum Tixier-Durivault, 1956
Lobophytum depressum Tixier-Durivault, 1966
Lobophytum durum Tixier-Durivault, 1956
Lobophytum gazellae Moser, 1919
Lobophytum hapalolobatum Verseveldt, 1983
Lobophytum hirsutum Tixier-Durivault, 1956
lobophytum hsiehi Benayahu & Ofwegen, 2011
Lobophytum ignotum Tixier-Durivault, 1956
Lobophytum irregulare Tixier-Durivault, 1970
Lobophytum jaeckeli Tixier-Durivault, 1956
Lobophytum jasparsi van Ofwegen, 1999
Lobophytum laevigatum Tixier-Durivault, 1956
Lobophytum lamarcki Tixier-Durivault, 1956
Lobophytum latilobatum Verseveldt, 1971
Lobophytum legitimum Tixier-Durivault, 1970
Lobophytum lighti Moser, 1919
Lobophytum longispiculatum Li, 1984
Lobophytum meandriforme Tixier-Durivault, 1956
Lobophytum michaelae Tixier-Durivault, 1956
Lobophytum microlobulatum Tixier-Durivault, 1970
Lobophytum microspiculatum Tixier-Durivault, 1956
Lobophytum mirabile Tixier-Durivault, 1956
Lobophytum mortoni Benayahu & van Ofwegen, 2009
Lobophytum oligoverrucum Li, 1984
Lobophytum patulum Tixier-Durivault, 1956
Lobophytum pauciflorum (Ehrenberg, 1834)
Lobophytum planum Tixier-Durivault, 1970
Lobophytum proprium (Tixier-Durivault, 1970)
Lobophytum prostratum Verseveldt & Benayahu, 1983
Lobophytum pusillum Tixier-Durivault, 1970
Lobophytum pygmapedium Li, 1984
Lobophytum ransoni Tixier-Durivault, 1957
Lobophytum rigidum Benayahu, 1995
Lobophytum rotundum Tixier-Durivault, 1957
Lobophytum salvati Tixier-Durivault, 1970
Lobophytum sarcophytoides Moser, 1919
Lobophytum schoedei Moser, 1919
Lobophytum solidum Tixier-Durivault, 1970
Lobophytum spicodigitum Li, 1984
Lobophytum strictum Tixier-Durivault, 1957
Lobophytum tecticum Alderslade & Shirwaiker, 1991
Lobophytum variatum Tixier-Durivault, 1957
Lobophytum varium Tixier-Durivault, 1970
Lobophytum venustum Tixier-durivault, 1957
Lobophytum verrucosum Li, 1984
Lobophytum verum Tixier-Durivault, 1970

References

Alcyoniidae